İhsangazi, formerly Mergüze, is a town in Kastamonu Province in the Black Sea region of Turkey. It is the seat of İhsangazi District. Its population is 2,891 (2021).

References

Populated places in Kastamonu Province
İhsangazi District
Towns in Turkey